Muay Chaiya is a style of traditional Thai boxing, founded about over 200 years ago. The founder was an army leader of the Rattanakosin Kingdom in the age of King Rama V. He taught Muay Chaiya to regular townspeople. The word “Muay” refers to boxing and “Chaiya” refers to the name of the city. The people who made Muay Chaiya famous are Kham Sriyapai  and Plong Jumnonthong. Plong Jumnongthong popularized Muay Chaiya by showing Muay Chaiya techniques and winning a fight with the boxer from Korat (Nakornratchasrima)  in front of King Rama V. Then, King Rama V awarded him the title of “muen muay mee cheu” (หมื่นมวยมีชื่อ).

Muay Chaiya has both of offensive and defensive techniques. Offensive techniques are throwing, smashing, grappling, and breaking. Defensive techniques are dodging, pushing, and blocking. Muay Chaiya also has a specific step called Yang Sam Khum. The word “Yang” refers to walk, while the word “Sam” refers to three, and the word “Khum” refers to a point. Yang Sam Khum uses three steps to change the position of the front and back legs. The key advantage of Yang Sam Khum is its speed and precision.

See also

Krabi Krabong
Lerdrit
Muay Boran
Muay Thai
Tomoi

References

Muay Thai